Ogawa, Ibaraki may refer to:

 Ogawa-machi, town in Higashiibaraki District, Ibaraki Prefecture
 Ogawa-mura, village in Naka District, Ibaraki Prefecture